Club Deportivo Cultural Sport Huanta (sometimes referred as Sport Huanta) is a Peruvian football club, playing in the city of Huanta, Ayacucho, Peru.

History
The Club Deportivo Cultural Sport Huanta was founded on February 17, 2012.

In 2013 Copa Perú, the club classified to the Provincial Stage, but was eliminated when finished in third place.

In 2015 Copa Perú, the club classified to the Departamental Stage, but was eliminated by Deportivo Municipal (Kimbiri) in the Quarterfinals.

In 2016 Copa Perú, the club classified to the National Stage, but was eliminated by José María Arguedas in the Repechage.

In 2017 Copa Perú, the club classified to the Departamental Stage, but was eliminated by Los Audaces de Mayapo in the Semifinals.

In 2018 Copa Perú, the club classified to the National Stage, but was eliminated by Santos in the Second Stage.

In 2019 Copa Perú, the club classified to the National Stage, but was eliminated by Sport Chavelines in the Round of 16.

Rivalries
Sport Huanta has had a long-standing rivalry with local club Player Villafuerte. The rivalry between Villafuerte and Huanta known as the Clásico Huantino.

Honours

Regional
Liga Departamental de Ayacucho:
Winners (2): 2018, 2019
Runner-up (1): 2016

Liga Provincial de Huanta:
Winners (2): 2016, 2018
Runner-up (3): 2015, 2017, 2019

Liga Distrital de Huanta:
Winners (2): 2013, 2016
Runner-up (3): 2017, 2018, 2019

See also
List of football clubs in Peru
Peruvian football league system

References

External links
 

Football clubs in Peru
Association football clubs established in 2012